Ransom is an internationally co-produced drama television series created by David Vainola and produced by Frank Spotnitz, starring Luke Roberts, that began airing on CBS. Ordered straight-to-series with 13 episodes on June 6, 2016, the series is a co-production between Canada's Global, France's TF1, the United States' CBS, and Germany's RTL, while the latter is airing the series on its sister network VOX. The series premiered on Global and CBS on January 1, 2017.

On May 17, 2017, CBS announced that Ransom was cancelled in the United States. A day later, RTLGroup also reported that they left the project after low ratings in Germany. It was reported on the same day that the other broadcasters behind the series were attempting to fund a second season. In late June, various sources reported that Global and TF1 ordered a second season, to be produced without the former partners. Production was set to start in late July 2017. On October 10, 2017, CBS and Global officially announced that Ransom had been renewed for a 13-episode second season, which premiered on April 7, 2018 on CBS in the United States. On July 16, 2018, CBS and Global announced that the series has been renewed for a 13-episode third season, which premiered on February 16, 2019.

On July 3, 2019, CBS announced that the series had been cancelled after three seasons.

Ransom was the first newly U.S. scripted series that debuted on its Saturday night schedule since The District cancelled in 2004.

Premise
The series follows Eric Beaumont, an experienced crisis and hostage negotiator, and his team, who solve kidnap and ransom cases involving the most dangerous criminals in the world.

The series is inspired by the real life negotiators Laurent Combalbert and Marwan Mery.

Cast

Main
 Luke Roberts as Eric Beaumont, an experienced crisis and hostage negotiator. He grew up in Chicago, where his mother, a surgeon, still lives
 Nazneen Contractor as Zara Hallam, the team's lead investigator
 Brandon Jay McLaren as Oliver Yates, a psychological profiler
 Sarah Greene as Maxine Carlson (season 1–2), a crisis and hostage negotiator who acts as Beaumont's second. She takes leave from the team during the second season after being forced to use lethal force against a perpetrator to save Oliver.
 Karen LeBlanc as Cynthia Walker (season 2–3), a crisis and hostage negotiator who works with Eric on a case during the second season, and eventually joins the team as Maxine's replacement as Beaumont's new second

Recurring
 Emma de Caunes as Nathalie Denard, Eric's ex-wife and the CEO of an insurance company
 Carlo Rota as Damian Delaine, an enemy from Eric Beaumont's past
 Natalie Brown as Kate Barrett (season 3), an FBI agent and Eric's girlfriend
 Emmanuel Kabongo as Tyler LeFebure (season 3)

Filming
The first season was filmed in Toronto, Canada and Nice, France. Toronto stood in for locations in North America. Eight episodes were shot in Toronto and five were shot in Nice.

The second season began shooting in Toronto and Budapest, Hungary in November 2017, with production expected to finish in May 2018.

The third season was filmed in Budapest, Hungary.

Episodes

Season 1 (2017)

Season 2 (2018)

Season 3 (2019)

Home media
In Australia (Region 4), Via Vision Entertainment will release "The Complete Series" boxset on October 21, 2020.

Reception
On Rotten Tomatoes season 1 has an approval rating of 47% based on reviews from 15 critics. The website's consensus states: "Ransom is a typical network procedural that lacks any originality or excitement."

References

External links
 
 

2010s American crime drama television series
2010s Canadian crime drama television series
2017 American television series debuts
2017 Canadian television series debuts
2017 German television series debuts
2017 French television series debuts
2019 American television series endings
2019 Canadian television series endings
2019 German television series endings
2019 French television series endings
American action television series
Canadian action television series
German action television series
French action television series
English-language television shows
CBS original programming
Global Television Network original programming
TF1 original programming
VOX (German TV channel) original programming
Television series by Corus Entertainment
Television series by Entertainment One
Television shows filmed in Toronto
Television shows filmed in France
Television shows filmed in Hungary